Extraordinary may refer to:

 "Extraordinary" (Clean Bandit song), 2014
 "Extraordinary" (Liz Phair song), 2004
 "Extraordinary" (Mandy Moore song), 2007
 "Extraordinary" (Prince song), 1999
 "Extraordinary" (TV series), British superhero comedy TV series (2023)
 "Extraordinary", a song by Idina Menzel from Idina, 2016
 ExtraOrdinary, an EP by Nizlopi, 2006
 The Extraordinary, a 1990s Australian television documentary series

See also